Pichucalco is a town and one of the 119 municipalities of Chiapas, in southern Mexico.

As of 2010, the municipality had a total population of 29,813, up from 29,357 as of 2005. 
It covers an area of 1,078.1 km².

As of 2010, the city of Pichucalco had a population of 14,212. Other than the city of Pichucalco, the municipality had 86 localities, the largest of which (with 2010 populations in parentheses) was: Nuevo Nicapa (1,346), classified as rural.

Pichucalco served as the head town for the Second Federal Electoral District of Chiapas between 1996 and 2005.

See also
El Chichón

References

Municipalities of Chiapas